Ryan Lee Amoo (born 11 October 1983) is an English footballer, who plays for Leicester Nirvana F.C.

He played in the Football League for Northampton Town and Lincoln City.

Career
Amoo began his career with Aston Villa, featuring in the FA Youth Cup winning side of 2002. In March 2004 he moved on to Northampton Town, agreeing a 15-month contract with the club and making his debut as a last minute substitute in the 2–1 victory over Oxford United on 3 April 2004. In his first full season with Northampton, Amoo managed 19 starts for the first-team and at the end of March 2005 his contract was terminated.

At this point, Amoo was involved in an 11-month relationship with the reality television star Jade Goody and, following their separation, dropped out of the professional ranks to join Leicestershire Senior League side Highfield Rangers. He moved to their league rivals Barrow Town for whom he made a goal scoring debut in their 4–0 away victory over Holwell Sports on 8 November 2005.

In July 2006, Amoo was offered a trial with Lincoln City whose then Director of Football John Deehan had worked with Amoo at Northampton and Aston Villa. The trial was successful with Amoo agreeing a one-year contract with the Imps. The 2006–07 season saw Amoo establish himself as a regular in the first-team, starting 40 league games and being rewarded with a new two-year contract at the end of the season. His last appearance for the club came against Bury on 1 January 2008, and he was released from his contract by mutual consent at the end of the 2007–08 season. He then moved to Midland Alliance league side Barwell. He scored his first goal for the club in a 4–1 victory over St Andrews in a Westerby Challenge Cup tie on 11 November 2008. He moved on to join Leicestershire Senior League side Thurnby Nirvana before signing for Stamford in March 2009, making his debut in the home 1–0 defeat to Rushall Olympic on 14 March 2009. His spell with the Daniels however was brief and he ended the season back with Thurnby Nirvana whilst also playing for Premier Sports Travel in the Alliance Football League, Leicester's leading Sunday morning league.

On 12 February 2010, Solihull Moors announced the double signing of Ryan Amoo and former Leeds United midfielder Simon Johnson. He left the club at the end of the 2009–2010 season and began the following season with Halesowen Town debuting in their Southern League Premier Division goalless draw at home to Weymouth on 14 August 2010 before departing the club without making a further appearance. In October 2010 he rejoined Solihull Moors and, for the 2011–12 season, Thurnby Nirvana. In Summer 2016 signed for newly promoted Montpellier F.C. and after two years, in August 2018 for Leicester Nirvana.

Honours

Aston Villa 
 FA Youth Cup
 Winner: 2001–02
 Premier Reserve League
 Winner: 2003–04

Lincoln City
  Lincolnshire Senior Cup
Winner 2007

External links

Lincoln City F.C. Official Archive Profile

References

1983 births
Living people
Footballers from Leicester
English footballers
Aston Villa F.C. players
Northampton Town F.C. players
Highfield Rangers F.C. players
Barrow Town F.C. players
Lincoln City F.C. players
Barwell F.C. players
Leicester Nirvana F.C. players
Stamford A.F.C. players
Solihull Moors F.C. players
Halesowen Town F.C. players
English Football League players
Association football utility players
Association football fullbacks
Association football midfielders